Celestial may refer to:

Science 
 Objects or events seen in the sky and the following astronomical terms:
 Astronomical object, a naturally occurring physical entity, association, or structure that exists in the observable universe
 Celestia, a 3D astronomy program that allows users to travel through the universe, also known as a celestial body or object 
 Celestial coordinate system, a system for mapping positions on the celestial sphere
 Celestial mechanics, the branch of astronomy that deals with the motions of celestial objects
 Celestial navigation, a position-fixing technique that helps sailors cross the oceans
 Celestial pole, the two points in the sky, north and south, where the projection of a planet's axis of rotation intersects its celestial sphere
 Celestial sphere, an imaginary sphere concentric with the Earthall objects in the sky can be thought of as projected upon the celestial sphere
 Celestial spheres, fundamental entities of the cosmological models developed by Plato, Aristotle, and others

Music 
 Celestial (Circle X album), the final full-length studio album by Circle X released in 1994
 Celestial (Isis album), the first full-length album by Isis released in 2000
 Celestial (RBD album), the third Spanish studio album by Mexican Latin pop group RBD
 "Celestial" (RBD song), a song from the above album
 Celestial (Versão Brasil), the Portuguese version of the album
 "Celestial" (Ed Sheeran song), a 2022 song by Ed Sheeran
 Celestial Recordings, a record label from 1998 to 2002
 Celestiial, a one-man funeral doom metal band from Minnesota
 "Celestial", a song by P.O.D. from Satellite
 "The Celestials" (song), the first single off the 2012 Smashing Pumpkins album Oceania

Television 
 Celestial digimon, used in Digimon Frontier, a TV series first broadcast in 2002
 Celestial Movies, a 24-hour satellite broadcast movie channel

Animal kingdom 
 Celestial Eye, a breed of goldfish related to the Telescope eye
 Celestial Parrotlet (Forpus coelestis), also known as Pacific Parrotlet and Lesson's Parrotlet

Games and comics 
 August Celestials, the four wild gods in World of Warcraft: Mists of Pandaria 
 Celestial (comics), a race of powerful alien beings in Marvel Comics
 Celestials (Dungeons & Dragons), a category of angel-like beings in the Dungeons & Dragons game
 Celestial Brush, in the video game Ōkami

Spirituality and religion 
 Body of light, also referred to as the celestial body, a "quasi material" aspect of the human body, neither solely physical nor spiritual
 Celestial Church of Christ, an African-initiated church founded 1947 in Benin
 Related to Heaven
 Celestial kingdom, the highest of three heavens or heavenly kingdoms in Mormon theology

Other uses
 Celestials, 19th century term for people of the Celestial Empire (China)

See also 

 Celesta
 Celestia (disambiguation)
 Celestial bodies, 2019 novel by Jokha Alharthi 
 Celestial Empire, a 19th-century term for Chinese emigrants to the United States, Canada, and Australia
 Celestial Seasonings
 Celestial Semiconductor
 Hain Celestial Group
 Tianchao Daguo or "Celestial Kingdom", a term used to refer to the country of China